Nikša Vujčić (born 25 September 1998) is a Serbian professional footballer who plays for Jagodina in the Serbian First League.

While with Mačva Šabac, he made two appearances in the Serbian SuperLiga.

References

External links
 
 
 

1998 births
Living people
Sportspeople from Šabac
Serbian footballers
Association football midfielders
OFK Žarkovo players
FK Mačva Šabac players
FK Jagodina players
Serbian First League players
Serbian SuperLiga players